Andrew Burnet Stoney (December 15, 1892 – April 28, 1973) was an American football coach. Stoney was the second head football coach at The Apprentice School in Newport News, Virginia and he held that position for two seasons, from 1922 until 1923.
His coaching record at Apprentice was 14–3.

Stoney later coached at the University of South Carolina, his alma mater. He also coached their basketball team in 1928.

The son of James Moss and Jane Johnston (Shannon) Stoney, Stoney later served in the North Carolina House of Representatives as a representative from Burke County, first being elected in 1941. He died on April 28, 1973.

References

External links
 

1892 births
1973 deaths
20th-century American politicians
American football tackles
The Apprentice Builders football coaches
Harvard Law School alumni
Members of the North Carolina House of Representatives
South Carolina Gamecocks football players
South Carolina Gamecocks men's basketball coaches
All-Southern college football players
People from Camden, South Carolina
People from Morganton, North Carolina